Russell Ian Williamson (born 17 March 1980) is a former English footballer who played as a midfielder.

Career
After progressing through the youth ranks, Williamson signed a professional contract with Wimbledon in June 1998. Upon his release from Wimbledon, Williamson underwent a trial with Scottish club Clyde. In November 2000, Williamson signed for Southend United. During his time at Southend, Williamson made twelve Football League appearances, starting nine times. Williamson scored twice for Southend, coming in FA Cup matches against Torquay United. Following his spell with Southend, Williamson dropped into Non-League football, playing for Chelmsford City, Bishop's Stortford, Hornchurch, Billericay Town, Heybridge Swifts, Waltham Abbey, Brimsdown Rovers and Enfield 1893.

During the 2009–10 season, Owusu played alongside former Wimbledon and Chelmsford teammate Ansah Owusu for Larsens in the Waltham Sunday Football League.

References

1980 births
Living people
Association football midfielders
English footballers
People from Loughton
Wimbledon F.C. players
Southend United F.C. players
Chelmsford City F.C. players
Bishop's Stortford F.C. players
Hornchurch F.C. players
Billericay Town F.C. players
Heybridge Swifts F.C. players
Waltham Abbey F.C. players
Brimsdown Rovers F.C. players
Enfield 1893 F.C. players
English Football League players